Jack Disney (born June 15, 1930) is a former American cyclist. He competed at the 1956, 1964 and the 1968 Summer Olympics.

References

1930 births
Living people
American male cyclists
Olympic cyclists of the United States
Cyclists at the 1956 Summer Olympics
Cyclists at the 1964 Summer Olympics
Cyclists at the 1968 Summer Olympics
Sportspeople from Topeka, Kansas
Pan American Games medalists in cycling
Pan American Games silver medalists for the United States
Competitors at the 1959 Pan American Games
Medalists at the 1959 Pan American Games
20th-century American people